Jean Hoefer Toal (born August 11, 1943) is a former chief justice of the Supreme Court of South Carolina. She was the first woman and the first Roman Catholic to serve as chief justice. In 2013, she became the first chief justice on the Supreme Court of South Carolina since the 1800s to run opposed in their reelection. Toal has continued to serve in the judiciary as a senior judge since her retirement from the Supreme Court.

Biography

Early career and tenure on the Supreme Court of South Carolina 
Toal graduated from Agnes Scott College in 1965 and the University of South Carolina School of Law in 1968, where she was Managing Editor of the South Carolina Law Review. When she graduated, she was one of 11 women in South Carolina actively practicing the law. As a lawyer, she argued before the United States Supreme Court on behalf of the Catawba Nation. In 1975, she was elected to the South Carolina House, representing Richland County as a Democrat. She was a statehouse representative for 13 years before being elected to the South Carolina Supreme Court in 1988 and sworn in on March 17, 1988, the first woman elected to this position.  She was reelected over Tom Ervin in 1996.

Toal was elected chief justice in 2000, and served until December 31, 2015, after reaching the mandatory retirement age for judges in South Carolina. In 2013, she was the first chief justice of the Supreme Court of South Carolina not to run opposed in the election since the 1800s. She took part in a number of landmark cases. In 2000, she chose to use the internet to organize court records instead of mainframe computers, a first in South Carolina. She served as the President of the Conference of Chief Justices from July 2007 to July 2008.

Life after the Supreme Court of South Carolina 
Toal oversaw the court cases involving Santee Cooper following the Nukegate scandal. She was required to sign off Santee Cooper's $520 million settlement with ratepayers. She has also overseen all asbestos-related litigation in South Carolina since leaving the South Carolina Supreme Court. She is the subject of Madame Chief Justice, a collection of essays about Toal which span her career.

See also
List of female state supreme court justices

References

1943 births
Living people
20th-century American women judges
20th-century American judges
21st-century American women judges
21st-century American judges
Agnes Scott College people
American women judges
Chief Justices of the South Carolina Supreme Court
Justices of the South Carolina Supreme Court
Lawyers from Columbia, South Carolina
Members of the South Carolina House of Representatives
Politicians from Columbia, South Carolina
University of South Carolina alumni
Women chief justices of state supreme courts in the United States
Women state legislators in South Carolina

Agnes Scott College alumni